The Standing Mute, etc. Act 1533 (25 Hen 8 c 3) was an Act of the Parliament of England. It stated that anyone who refused to plead in a criminal trial would not be eligible for benefit of clergy.

Acts of the Parliament of England (1485–1603)
1533 in law
1533 in England
English criminal law
History of the Church of England
Pleas